RM Sotheby's, formerly RM Auctions, is a classic car auction company headquartered in Blenheim, Ontario, Canada. With offices across the United States and several European countries, the company's services include restoration, private treaty sales, auctions (online and local), and financial services. It has been partly owned by Sotheby's, a global company dealing in fine art, since 2015.

History

Company
RM Auctions was established in 1991 by Rob Myers.

Kruse International sold the Auburn Auction Park to RM Auctions on July 1, 2010.

RM Auctions acquired Auctions America in 2010, only a few months after the latter's founding.  The subsidiary was run independently and under the Auctions America name until 2017, when it was more formally absorbed under the RM Auctions (by now, RM Sotheby's - see below) banner.

RM Auctions acquired Bator Vintage Motorcycle Auctions in 2011 via its Auctions America subsidiary to move further into the motorcycle auction business.

On February 18, 2015 RM Auctions announced the formation of a new strategic partnership with Sotheby's, with Sotheby's acquiring a 25 percent ownership interest in RM. The auction house was renamed RM Sotheby's.

Sales
RM averaged $303,000 per sale in 2007.

In 2009 the company held five of the top 10 and four of the top 5 all time records for the most expensive motor cars sold at auction, with the number one car being the 1957 Ferrari 250 Testa Rossa sold in May 2009 for $12,402,500 in Maranello, Italy.

As of December 2015, RM had sold 28 million-dollar-plus cars

On August 25, 2018, a Ferrari 250 GTO was sold at their Monterey auction for 48.4 million dollars, making it the most expensive car sold at auction.
In 2022, RM Sotheby’a shattered the world record for the world’s most expensive car ever by selling a A 1955 Mercedes-Benz 300 SLR Uhlenhaut Coupé for over  $140,000,000 USD.

Description
RM Sotheby's headquarters are in Blenheim, Ontario. RM Sotheby's has offices in Ontario, Canada, Richmond, United Kingdom, California, United States, Indiana, United States, Florida, United States, and Michigan, United States. It also has remote offices in France, Italy, Germany, Netherlands, and Switzerland.

References

External links
 

Canadian auction houses
Retail companies established in 1991
Conservation and restoration of vehicles